Nikos, Nikolaos or Nikolas Papadopoulos may refer to:

 Niccolò Comneno Papadopoli (1655–1740), Cretan-Italian lawyer and historian
 , scholar and trader from Epirus
 , fighter in the Greek War of Independence
  a.k.a. Nicolo Papadopoli Aldobrandini (1841-1922), Italian politician from Venice
  (1933-2012), Greek Old Testament scholar
 Nikos Papadopoulos (Swedish politician) (b. 1939)
 Nikos Papadopoulos (general) (d. 1971), Greek general
  (b. 1962)
 Nick Papadopulos (b. 1966), British priest
 Nikos Papadopoulos (footballer, born 1971)
 Nikolas Papadopoulos (b. 1973), Cypriot lawyer and politician
 Nikos Papadopoulos (footballer, born 1990), Greek goalkeeper
 Nikos Papadopoulos (Greek politician), MP elected for SYRIZA in September 2015

See also 
 Papadopoulos
 Papadopoli (disambiguation)
 Nikos Pappas (disambiguation)